The 2013 Princeton Tigers football team represented Princeton University in the 2013 NCAA Division I FCS football season. They were led by fourth-year head coach Bob Surace and played their home games at Powers Field at Princeton Stadium. Princeton was a member of the Ivy League. They finished with a record of 8–2 overall and 6–1 in Ivy League play to share the conference title with Harvard, their first title since 2006. Princeton averaged 7,042 fans per game.

Schedule

References

Princeton
Princeton Tigers football seasons
Ivy League football champion seasons
Princeton Tigers football